82 (eighty-two) is the natural number following 81 and preceding 83.

In mathematics
82 is:
 the twenty-third semiprime and the twelfth of the form (2×q).
 a companion Pell number.
 a happy number.
 palindromic in bases 3 (100013), 9 (1019) and 40 (2240).

In science
The atomic number of lead.
The sixth magic number.
Messier 82, a starburst galaxy in the constellation Ursa Major.
The New General Catalogue object NGC 82, a single star in the constellation Andromeda.

In other fields
Eighty-two is also:

The model number of: Mark 82 bomb, a nonguided general-purpose bomb.
The number of the French department Tarn-et-Garonne.
The code for international direct dial phone calls to South Korea.
The ISBN Group Identifier for books published in Norway.
Title of Dennis Smith's book about firefighters, Report from Engine Co. 82.
The year AD 82, 82 BC, or 1982, stylized as '82.
The number of Trip Murphy's (Matt Dillon) car in Herbie: Fully Loaded (2005).
The second studio album by African electropop outfit Just a Band (2009).
The number (*82) to unblock your caller ID for phones that block anonymous incoming calls.
The very significant number that appears at the end of Kurt Vonnegut's book Hocus Pocus.

In sports
Both the NBA and NHL operate 82-game regular seasons.
 In Major League Baseball, the number of games a team must win to secure a winning season.

References 

Integers